Tympanistes testacea is a species of moth of the family Nolidae. It is found in India.

References

Moths described in 1867
Chloephorinae
Moths of Asia